The Italian ambassador in Algiers is the official representative of the Government in Rome to the Government of Algeria.

List of representatives 
<onlyinclude>

References 

 
Algeria
Italy